is the second single from singer and cellist Kanon Wakeshima and An Cafe bassist Kanon's duo group Kanon x Kanon, and Wakeshima's fourth overall single. The song was used as the opening song for the anime adaption of 30-sai no Hoken Taiiku.

Track listing

Personnel
 Kanon Wakeshima – Vocals, Cello, Piano, Lyrics
 Kanon - Bass, Lyrics, Production

References 

2011 singles
2011 songs
Anime songs